The Pattom A. Thanu Pillai ministry was a Kerala government ministry formed on 22 February 1960 and lasted till 26 September 1962.

Background 

After E M S Namboothiripad Government was dismissed, Kerala was under President rule. Elections were held to the legislative assembly on 1 February 1960.

Indian National Congress became the largest party with 63 seats in the assembly after the elections. Communists became the second largest party 26 seats and Praja Socialist Party (PSP) got 20 seats. Congress and PSP formed a coalition government, with Pattom A Thanu Pillai of PSP as the Chief Minister, and R Sankar from Congress as the Deputy Chief Minister. Even though PSP was a junior partner in the coalition, Pattam was chosen as the Chief Minister because the congress leader R Sankar was from Ezhava caste which the Nair Service Society, the main supporters of Congress, disapproved of. Pattam previously held the posts of Prime Minister in the erstwhile Travancore state, and later the Chief Minister of Travancore-Cochin state.

Pattam resigned on 26 September 1962 when he was posted as the Governor of Punjab. This paved the way for the first Congress chief minister in Kerala under R. Sankar.

Council of Ministers

See also 
 List of chief ministers of Kerala
 Kerala Council of Ministers
 1960 Kerala Legislative Assembly election

References

 http://www.niyamasabha.org/codes/Ministers%20Book%20Final.pdf

Kerala ministries
1960 establishments in Kerala
1962 disestablishments in India
Cabinets established in 1960
Cabinets disestablished in 1962